Zinc finger protein 257 is a protein that in humans is encoded by the ZNF257 gene.

References

Further reading 

Human proteins